Gaurav Khanna (born 11 December 1981) is an Indian actor and model. He is known for his roles of Neil in Jeevan Saathi, Inspector Kavin in CID, and Akshay in Tere Bin. He currently portrays Anuj Kapadia in Star Plus's Anupamaa.

Career
Khanna worked as a marketing manager in an IT firm for nearly a year before switching careers. He started his career appearing in television commercials. His first appearance on a television show was in Bhabhi. His next role was in Kumkum – Ek Pyara Sa Bandhan. Khanna's first lead role was in Meri Doli Tere Angana in 2007.

Personal life 
In early 2016, Khanna was revealed to be dating television actress Akanksha Chamola. The couple were married on 24 November 2016 in his hometown Kanpur.

Filmography

Television

Web series

Awards and nominations

References

External links
 
 

Indian male television actors
Living people
Indian television presenters
1966 births
Indian male models
People from Kanpur
Male actors from Uttar Pradesh